Chalcidoptera appensalis is a moth in the family Crambidae. It was described by Snellen in 1884. It is found in the Democratic Republic of Congo (Orientale), Togo, Zambia, India, Indonesia (Java, Sulawesi), Myanmar and Sri Lanka.

References

Moths described in 1884
Spilomelinae